Civic Theatre may refer to:

Australia
 Civic Theatre, Adelaide (1932–1957), in Hindley Street, formerly the Wondergraph
Newcastle Civic Theatre, Newcastle, New South Wales
Wagga Wagga Civic Theatre, Wagga Wagga, New South Wales

Ireland
Civic Theatre (Tallaght), Dublin

New Zealand
Civic Theatre, Auckland
Civic Theatre (Invercargill)

South Africa
Joburg Theatre, previously Johannesburg Civic Theatre

United Kingdom
Bedford Civic Theatre, Bedfordshire
Leeds City Museum, previously the Civic Theatre
Oswaldtwistle Civic Theatre, Oswaldtwistle, Lancashire
Rotherham Civic Theatre and Arts Centre, Rotherham, South Yorkshire

United States 

San Diego Civic Theatre, California
Civic Theatre (Fort Wayne), Indiana, which played Frankenstein – A New Musical and other shows
Civic Theatre (New Orleans), Louisiana
Farmington Civic Theatre, Michigan
Akron Civic Theatre, Ohio
Civic Theatre of Allentown, Pennsylvania
Spokane Civic Theatre, Washington

See also
The Civic (disambiguation)